James Gourlay (11 January 1888 – 12 September 1970) was a Scottish footballer.

He played for Port Glasgow Athletic, and for Everton in England between 1909 and 1913 before joining Morton as part of an exchange deal for John Fulton. He remained an important member of the Greenock club's strong team in the era spanning World War I when they finished in the top four of the Scottish Football League for six seasons running, and won the War Fund Shield in 1915.

Aged 34, Gourlay scored the only goal (with a free kick) in Morton's 1–0 win over Rangers in the 1922 Scottish Cup Final which is, to date, the club's only major trophy. He later had a short spell at Third Lanark.

Gourlay played in the Home Scots v Anglo-Scots annual trial match in 1914 and was selected for the Scottish Football League XI either side of the war, but never gained a full international cap. His father James Gourlay played once for Scotland in 1888; they are related to the lawn bowls champions David Gourlay Sr. and David Gourlay Jr.

References

1888 births
1970 deaths
Scottish footballers
Everton F.C. players
Greenock Morton F.C. players
Scottish Football League players
Scottish Football League representative players
Association football inside forwards
Association football wing halves
Annbank F.C. players
English Football League players
Port Glasgow Athletic F.C. players
Greenock Morton F.C. non-playing staff
Third Lanark A.C. players
Footballers from South Ayrshire
Scottish expatriates in Sweden
Jimmy
People from Tarbolton